Sturgeon is a city in Boone County, Missouri, United States. It is part of the Columbia, Missouri Metropolitan Statistical Area. The population was 872 at the 2010 census.

History
Sturgeon was laid out in 1856 very near to and eventually including the town of Prairie City. The town was incorporated in 1859 with Housen Canada as the first mayor and rechartered in 1875. It was named for Isaac H. Sturgeon, superintendent of the North Missouri Railroad. Colonel W. F. Switzler speculated that the depot was considered in Sturgeon because it bore the name of the railroad magnate, but six citizens who paid six thousand dollars finalized the deal. The first school-house was built in 1857, and in 1882 the white and colored schools had 301 students with an average daily attendance of 187. The first church, built in 1859, was the Methodist Episcopal Church South, with the Masonic lodge located above. The first early industry in Sturgeon was the broom factory, established in 1878, of S. A. Fretwell. The brooms were made of broom corn grown in the area, and brushes made of imported jute. In 1882, the factory turned out about 360 brooms daily

The first large fire took place on July 19, 1882. That evening, a fire was discovered in Wood's Saloon, already bursting through the roof. The butcher's shop, three saloons, three large livery stable buildings and sheds, and three other buildings were burned. The Sturgeon Savings Bank was saved from fire "by covering the roof with carpet and sprinkling heavily with salt."

Amish
In the fall of 1953, the first Amish family moved to the land just north of Sturgeon. Now the community has expanded to over sixty families. Most of the Sturgeon Amish adhere closely to their beliefs and are classified as Old Order Amish, meaning they follow a very conservative Ordnung: self-sufficiency, charity, and individualism are very important. The community in Sturgeon and Clark operate many successful home businesses, selling sorghum, eggs, chicken, peanut brittle and produce in season.

Geography
Sturgeon is located just south of the northern border of Boone County, approximately two miles east of U.S. Route 63, along Missouri Route CC.

Demographics

2010 census
As of the census of 2010, there were 872 people, 361 households, and 244 families living in the city. The racial makeup of the city was 96.8% White, 0.5% African American, 0.7% Native American, 0.6% Asian, 0.6% from other races, and 0.9% from two or more races. Hispanic or Latino of any race were 1.0% of the population.

There were 361 households, of which 30.5% had children under the age of 18 living with them, 49.6% were married couples living together, 14.4% had a female householder with no husband present, 3.6% had a male householder with no wife present, and 32.4% were non-families. 27.7% of all households were made up of individuals, and 14.6% had someone living alone who was 65 years of age or older. The average household size was 2.38 and the average family size was 2.84.

The median age in the city was 39.7 years. 23.4% of residents were under the age of 18; 9.6% were between the ages of 18 and 24; 24.3% were from 25 to 44; 27% were from 45 to 64; and 15.8% were 65 years of age or older. The gender makeup of the city was 45.4% male and 54.6% female.

2000 census
As of the census of 2000, there were 944 people, 382 households, and 260 families living in the city. The population density was 1,494.9 people per square mile (578.5/km). There were 407 housing units at an average density of 644.5 per square mile (249.4/km). The racial makeup of the city was 97.35% White, 0.53% African American, 0.64% Native American, 0.21% Asian, 0.42% from other races, and 0.85% from two or more races. Hispanic or Latino of any race were 0.42% of the population.

There were 382 households, out of which 31.7% had children under the age of 18 living with them, 52.6% were married couples living together, 9.7% had a female householder with no husband present, and 31.9% were non-families. 27.7% of all households were made up of individuals, and 16.2% had someone living alone who was 65 years of age or older. The average household size was 2.42 and the average family size was 2.91.

In the city the population was spread out, with 25.0% under the age of 18, 9.0% from 18 to 24, 28.5% from 25 to 44, 21.1% from 45 to 64, and 16.4% who were 65 years of age or older. The median age was 36 years. For every 100 females, there were 93.0 males. For every 100 females age 18 and over, there were 90.8 males.

The median income for a household in the city was $33,173, and the median income for a family was $44,196. Males had a median income of $30,074 versus $23,021 for females. The per capita income for the city was $15,830. About 3.5% of families and 8.6% of the population were below the poverty line, including 5.9% of those under age 18 and 16.8% of those age 65 or over.

References

External links
 City of Sturgeon

 
Cities in Boone County, Missouri
Columbia metropolitan area (Missouri)
Cities in Missouri